Anas Zabani (born 7 April 1997) is a Saudi Arabian footballer who currently plays as a full-back.

Club career
Anas Mahdi Zabani was a player in Al-Hilal youth, but was promoted to the first team in 2017. On 29 January 2017, Anas was promoted to Al-Hilal first team. On 29 April 2017, Anas was chosen to be a sub against Al-Wehda but he didn't play the match.

On 31 January 2023, Zabani was released by Al-Qadsiah.

References

Al Tuhami Club players
Al Hilal SFC players
Al Batin FC players
Al-Qadsiah FC players
Al-Shoulla FC players
Saudi Professional League players
Saudi First Division League players
Saudi Arabian footballers
Association football defenders
1997 births
Living people